The Ubuntu Museum: African Museum of Humanity is a small museum in Roehampton, London dedicated to the experiences of people of colour in Britain and the West.

History 
The museum was founded by artist Jackie Mwanza in 2018.

Exhibitions and activities 
The Nude Gallery in 2019 focussed on the assumptions of the colour nude in everyday life, highlighting that historically it has been only applicable to those with lighter skin tones.  In 2020 the museum hosted events for Black History Month on the use of recycled materials and found objects in art, in particular focussing on the sculptor El Anatsui.  The museum will host workshops for children about recycled art in 2021.

Location 
The Museum is based in a former commercial unit at 6 Portswood place on the Alton Estate in Roehampton.

Transport 
The museum is served by Transport for London buses 170, 430, 639 and 670 which stop on Danebury Avenue. Barnes railway station (Southwestern Railway) is a 25-minute walk from the museum.

References

External links 
 Ubuntu Museum website
 Ubuntu Museum youtube channel

Roehampton
Putney
Museums in the London Borough of Wandsworth
Local museums in London
Art museums and galleries in London
Cultural organisations based in London
Black British culture in London
African culture